Ecclesiastical titles are the formal styles of address used for members of the clergy.

Catholic Church

Latin Church clergy

 Pope: Pope (Regnal Name); His Holiness; Your Holiness; Holy Father.
 Patriarch of an autonomous/particular church: Patriarch (Given Name); His Beatitude; Your Beatitude.
 Cardinal: (First Name) Cardinal (Last Name); His Eminence; Your Eminence.
 Cardinal who is also an archbishop: (First Name) Cardinal (Last Name), Archbishop of (Place); His Eminence; Your Eminence.
 Archbishop: The Most Reverend (Full Name), (any postnominals), Archbishop of (Place); bishops in the U.S. commonly indicate their terminal degree(s) as postnominals, e.g., J.C.D. or S.T.D., or Ph.D. or D.D.; His Excellency; Your Excellency. Titular archbishops almost never indicate their respective sees in their titles.
 Bishop: The Most Reverend (Full Name), (any postnominals), Bishop of (Place); bishops in the U.S. commonly indicate their terminal degree(s) as postnominals, e.g., J.C.D., S.T.D., or Ph.D. or D.D.; His Excellency; Your Excellency. Titular bishops almost never indicate their respective sees in their titles.
 Abbot: The Right Reverend (Full Name), (any religious order's postnominals); The Right Reverend Abbot; Abbot (Given Name); Abbot (Surname); Dom (Given Name); Father (Given Name). The custom for address depends on personal custom and custom in the abbey.
 Abbess, Prioress, or other superior of a religious order of women or a province thereof: The Reverend Mother (Full Name), (any religious order's postnominals); Mother (Given Name). The title of women religious superiors varies greatly, and the custom of a specific order should be noted.
 Protonotary Apostolic, Honorary Prelate, or Chaplain of His Holiness: The Reverend Monsignor (Full Name); Monsignor (Surname). The postnominals P.A. are often added for protonotaries apostolic. Postnominals are rarely added for honorary prelates or chaplains of His Holiness.
 Vicar General: The Very Reverend (Full Name), V.G.; The Reverend (Full Name), V.G.; Father (Surname).
 Judicial Vicar, Ecclesiastical Judge, Episcopal Vicar, Vicar Forane, Dean, Provincial Superior, or Rector: The Very Reverend (Full Name); Father (Surname).
 Prior, both superiors of or in monasteries, or of provinces or houses of a religious order: The Very Reverend (Full Name), (any religious order's postnominals); Father (Surname).
 Pastor of a parish, Parochial Vicar, Chaplain, or Priest: The Reverend (Full Name); Father (Surname).
 Permanent Deacon: The Reverend Deacon (Full Name); Deacon (Surname); Deacon (Given Name) (informal).
 Transitional Deacon, i.e., a deacon who is studying for the priesthood: The Reverend Mr. (Full Name); Deacon (Full Name); Deacon (Surname).
 Brother: Brother (Full Name), (any religious order's postnominals); Brother (Given Name). In some teaching orders Brother (Surname) is customary.
 Religious sister or nun: Sister (Full Name), (any religious order's postnominals); Sister (Full Name); Sister (Given Name) (informal).
 Candidate for priestly ministry (seminarian): The Reverend Seminarian (Full Name); Mr. (Full Name); Mr. (Surname).
 Candidate for diaconal or lay ministry (deacon candidate or lay ecclesial minister candidate): Mr. (Full Name); Mr. (Surname).

United Kingdom and some other English-speaking countries

The major difference between U.S. practice and that in several other English-speaking countries is the form of address for archbishops and bishops. In Britain and countries whose Roman Catholic usage it directly influenced:
 Archbishop: the Most Reverend (Most Rev.); addressed as Your Grace rather than His Excellency or Your Excellency.
 Bishop: "the Right Reverend" (Rt. Rev.); formally addressed as My Lord rather than Your Excellency. This style is an ancient one, and has been used in the western church for more than a thousand years; it corresponds to, but does not derive from, the Italian Monsignore and the French Monseigneur. However, most bishops prefer to be addressed simply as Bishop (Bp.).

In Ireland, and in other countries whose Roman Catholic usage it influenced, all bishops, not archbishops alone, are titled the Most Reverend (Most Rev.).

Clergy are often referred to with the title Doctor (Dr.), or have D.D. (Doctor of Divinity) placed after their name, where justified by their possession of such degree.

Italy
Similar to, and the source of, most of the U.S. English titles, with some variation:

 Diocesan priest: The Reverend Lord (Dominus in Latin) (abbreviated as Rev. Do.); Don.
 Religious priest: Padre; Father (Fr.).
 Religious sister: The Reverend Sister (Rev. Sr.).
 (Permanent) Deacon: Deacon (Dcn.).

The Philippines
In the predominantly Catholic Philippines, ecclesiastical addresses are adapted from American custom but with modifications. The titles listed below are only used in the most formal occasions by media or official correspondence, save for the simpler forms of address. Post-nominals that indicate academic degree or membership in a religious order are usually included.

 The Pope is always titled "Ang Kaniyáng Kabanalan" (Filipino for "His Holiness"). As such, the Pope is styled "Ang Kaniyáng Kabanalan Papa Francisco".
 A cardinal is formally styled and addressed as "Ang Kaniyáng Kabunyian", literally denoting "His Illustriousness" (Philippine English for "His Eminence"). Cardinals are informally addressed as "Cardinal" followed by their names; for example, "Cardinal Juan". Unlike in the United States, Ireland or Commonwealth nations, the name of a cardinal is always inscribed in the formula first name, "Cardinal", and last name; for example, "Juan Cardinal de la Cruz", similar to the syntax in German.
 An archbishop is titled "Ang Mahál na Arsobispo" ("His Excellency, the Archbishop"). Archbishops are often addressed as "Archbishop" followed by their names; for example, "Archbishop Juan de la Cruz".
 A bishop is titled "Ang Mahál na Obispo" ("His Excellency, the Bishop"), in similar fashion to archbishops, and more commonly as "Ang Lubháng Kagalanggalang" ("The Most Reverend"). Also similar to archbishops, bishops are often addressed as "Bishop" followed by their names; for example, "Bishop Juan de la Cruz".
 A monsignor is titled "Reberendo Monsenyor" ("Reverend Monsignor"), although if he holds extra administrative office he is titled according to his office. Vicars general, forane, and episcopal are titled "Very Reverend". Monsignori are colloquially addressed as "Monsignor" (abbreviated as "Msgr."). As defined, the inscribed title is "Monsignor" followed by first and then last name, or "The Reverend Monsignor" followed by first and then last name, while the spoken address is "Monsignor" followed by only last name.
 Priests, both diocesan and those of a religious order, are titled "Reberendo Padre" ("Reverend Father", abbreviated as "Rev. Fr.") before their first and then last names. Priests are colloquially addressed as "Father" (abbreviated as "Fr.") before either their true name or last name, even their nickname. Reverend Father as a full title is similar to Anglican or Eastern Orthodox usage, in contrast to practice in some other English-speaking nations. However, "The Rev." alone before priests' names is usually found in articles sourced from the United States, like the Associated Press (AP), in Philippine newspapers.
 A deacon is titled "Reberendo" ("Reverend"); for example, "Reverend Juan de la Cruz". Deacons are rarely titled "Deacon" followed by their names as in the United States, except when addressing them formally. Instead, they are colloquially addressed as "Rev." in contrast to priests who are addressed as "Father".
 Consecrated persons:
 Religious sisters are titled "Sister" (abbreviated as "Sr."). Superiors are optionally titled "Mother" (abbreviated as "Mo.") and are usually addressed formally as "Reverend Sister/Mother" (abbreviated as "Rev. Sr./Mo."); for example, "Rev. Sr. Juana de la Cruz, OP" or "Rev. Mo. Juana de la Cruz, OSB". Contemplative nuns are formally and colloquially titled "Sor", a truncation of "Soror", which is Latin for "Sister". Prioresses and abbesses are formally addressed as "Reverend Mother".
 Religious brothers who are not priests are titled "Brother" (abbreviated as "Br."); for example, "Br. Juan de la Cruz, OFM". Having been influenced by the Spaniards, members of mendicant orders may be called "Fray"; for example, "Fray Juan de la Cruz, OSA". Since there are also mendicant orders whose missionaries are from Italy they opt to be addressed as "Fra", a truncation of "Frater", which is Latin for "Brother". Monks are called "'Dom'", an abbreviation of "Dominus" which means "Lord".

Eastern Catholic clergy

Although the styles and titles of Eastern Catholic clergy varies from language to language, in the Greek and Arabic-speaking world the following would be acceptable, but is by no means a full list of appropriate titles. It is notable that surnames are never used except in extra-ecclesial matters or to specify a particular person where many share one Christian name or ordination name. Where not noted, Western titles may be supposed. The following are common in Greek Melkite Catholic usage and in Greek Orthodox usage in the United States.

 Archbishop or Bishop: In Arabic, a bishop is titled "Sayedna", while in churches of Syriac tradition he is titled "Mar". If an Eastern Catholic archbishop or patriarch is made a cardinal he may be addressed as "His Eminence" and "Your Eminence", or the hybrid "His Beatitude and Eminence" and "Your Beatitude and Eminence". 
 Priest: In Arabic, "Abouna" and in Greek "Pappas".
 Deacon: Identical to that of a priest in all ways except sometimes in the use of "Father Deacon" (in Arabic "Abouna Shammas" and in Greek "Pappas Diakonos").
 Subdeacon: "Reverend Subdeacon" in inscribed address, and the Christian name with or without "Brother" is usually used, except in some traditions that use "Father Subdeacon". In Arabic, this is confused by "Shammas" being used for both the subdiaconate and the diaconate, the distinction being a "Deacon of the Letter" and a "Deacon of the Gospel" respectively. Often a deacon will be addressed as "Father" and a subdeacon as "Brother" to distinguish them.
 Reader: "Reader" or "Brother" depending on the preference of the addresser.
 Seminarians: "Brother" and "Brother Seminarian" are the most common titles; the appellations "Father Seminarian" and "Father Student" are used only by rural Greek- and Arabic-speaking laity.
 Tonsured persons without a title: "Brother".

Eastern Orthodox Church

Usage varies somewhat throughout the Eastern Orthodox Communion, and not every church uses every clerical rank. Surnames are typically not used for archpastors (rank of bishop or above) or monastics.

 Ecumenical Patriarch of Constantinople: Ecumenical Patriarch John II, His All-Holiness, Your All-Holiness
 Patriarch: Patriarch John II of Terirem, Patriarch John, His Beatitude, Your Beatitude
 Note: Some Patriarchs use the honorific "His/Your Holiness"
 Archbishop / Archiepiscope
 of an independent Church: The Most Reverend (Rev.) Archbishop John of Terirem, Archbishop John, His Beatitude, Your Beatitude
 of a sub-national Church: The Most Reverend (Rev.) Archbishop John of Terirem, Archbishop John, His Eminence, Your Eminence
 Metropolitan: The Most Reverend (Rev.) Metropolitan John of Terirem, Metropolitan John, His Eminence, Your Eminence
 Titular Metropolitan: The Most Reverend (Rev.) Metropolitan John of Terirem, His Eminence, Your Eminence
 Note: Some Metropolitans use the style "The Very Most Reverend" (V. Most Rev.)
 Note: A Metropolitan who is the head of an independent Church is addressed as "Beatitude" rather than "Eminence"
 Bishop / Episcope: The Right Reverend (Rt. Rev.) Bishop John of Terirem, Bishop John, His Grace, Your Grace
 Titular/Auxiliary Bishop: same as for Bishops, above Other Languages: Sayedna (Arabic), Despota (Greek), Vladika (Russian, Serbian) 
 Priest (Presbyter): The Reverend Father (Rev. Fr.) John Smith, Father John
 Protopriest: The Very Reverend (V. Rev.) Protopriest John Smith, Father (Fr.) John
 Archpriest: The Very Reverend (V. Rev.) Archpriest John Smith, Father (Fr.) John
 Archimandrite: The Very Reverend (V. Rev.) Archimandrite John, or The Right Reverend (Rt. Rev.) Archimandrite John, Father John
 Hieromonk (Priest-monk): The Reverend (Rev.) Hieromonk John, Father (Fr.) John
 Other Languages: Abouna (Arabic), Pappas (Greek), Batushka (Russian)
 Priest's Wife: Presbytera Mary (Greek), Khouria Mary (Arabic), Matushka Mary (Russian), Popadiya Mary (Serbian), Panimatushka Mary (Ukrainian), Preoteasa Mary (Romanian)
 Deacon: The Reverend Father (Rev. Fr.) John Smith, Deacon (Dn.) John Smith, Father John, Deacon Father (Dn. Fr.) John, Deacon (Dn.) John
 Protodeacon: The Reverend (Rev.) Protodeacon John Smith, Father (Fr.) John, Deacon Father (Dn. Fr.) John, Deacon (Dn.) John
 Archdeacon: The Reverend (Rev.) Archdeacon John Smith, Father (Fr.) John, Deacon Father (Dn. Fr.) John, Deacon (Dn.) John
 Hierodeacon (Deacon-monk): The Reverend (Rev.) Hierodeacon John, Father (Fr.) John
 Deacon's Wife: Diakonissa Mary (Greek), or the same titles as a priest's wife
 Abbot: The Right Reverend (Rt. Rev.) Abbot John, Abbot John, Father (Fr.) John
 Abbess: The Reverend (Rev.) Mother Superior Mary, The Very Reverend (V. Rev.) Abbess Mary, Reverend Mother Mary, Mother Mary
 Monk: Monk John, Father (Fr.) John
 Rassophore Monk: Rassophore Monk John, Father (Fr.) John
 Stavrophore Monk: Stavrophore Monk John, Father (Fr.) John
 Schemamonk: Schemamonk John, Father (Fr.) John
 Novice: Novice John, John; or Brother (Br.) John
 Note: the title "Brother" is a result of Latin influence; the title is only given to some novices with a special blessing.
 Nun: Nun Mary, Mother Mary
 Rassophore Nun: Rassophore Nun Mary, Sister Mary
 Novice: Sister Mary

Protestantism

 Lutheranism 

Archbishops/Presiding Bishops: the Most Reverend (Most Rev.); Archbishop (Abp.; Arch.; Archbp.)/Presiding Bishop (P.B.).
Bishops: Bishop (Bp.); Reverend Bishop (Rev. Bp.); the Right Reverend (Rt. Rev.).
Pastors: the Reverend (Rev.); Pastor (Pr.).
Kantors: the Reverend Kantor (Rev. Kantor)
Deacons: Deacon (Dcn.).
Vicars: Vicar (Vic.).
Seminarians: the Reverend Seminarian (Rev. Sem.).
 Ecclesiastical Doctors (Dr. eccl.), e.g., Ph.D. (Doctor of Philosophy), Dr. sc. rel. (Doctor of Religious Sciences/Studies),  Dr. mph. (Doctor of Christian Metaphysics), Dr. sc. bs. (Doctor of Biblical Studies), et al.: Reverend Doctor.

Anglicanism
Deacons are styled as The Reverend, The Reverend Deacon, or The Reverend Mr/Mrs/Miss/Ms/Mx.
Priests are usually styled as The Reverend, The Reverend Father/Mother (even if not a religious; abbreviated Fr/Mthr) or The Reverend Mr/Mrs/Miss.
Heads of some women's religious orders are styled as The Reverend Mother (even if not ordained).
Canons are often styled as The Reverend Canon.
Deans are usually styled as The Very Reverend.
Archdeacons are usually styled as The Venerable (The Ven).
Priors of monasteries may be styled as The Very Reverend.
 Abbots of monasteries may be styled as The Right Reverend.
Bishops are styled as The Right Reverend or His Lordship.
Archbishops and primates, including the Archbishop of Canterbury, and (for historical reasons) the Bishop of Meath and Kildare are styled as The Most Reverend, and addressed as Your Grace.

 Methodism 

Deacons, Ordained Elders, and Licensed ministers/priesters are addressed as Reverend, unless they hold a doctorate, in which case they are often addressed in formal situations as The Reverend Doctor. The Reverend, however, is used in more formal or in written communication, in addition to His/Her Reverence or Your Reverence. In informal situations Reverend is used. 
Bishops are styled as Bishop or Your Grace.
Religious brothers and sisters are styled as Br. or Sr.; for example, if their name was John Smith and they belonged to a religious order, they would be addressed as Brother John Smith.

References
Footnotes

Citations

Further reading
Catholic Encyclopedia (1913). Ecclesiastical Addresses.
Merriam-Webster (1997 HTML edition). Handbook of Style - Clerical and Religious forms of address.
Greek Orthodox Archdiocese of America. Etiquette and Protocol.Orthodox Christian Information Center. Clergy Etiquette.''